Airdrie South is one of the twenty-one wards used to elect members of the North Lanarkshire Council. It elects four councillors, with its territory unaffected by a national boundary review in 2017 – as its name suggests, this covers southern parts of Airdrie (including Brownsburn, Craigneuk, Moffat Mills, Petersburn and South Cairnhill neighbourhoods) plus the outlying settlements of Calderbank and Chapelhall, covering a population of 19,934 in 2019.

Councillors

Election Results

2022 Election

2017 Election

2012 Election

 

Labour councillor David Fagan was suspended from the party on 4 October 2016 over allegations of possession of child pornography.
Labour councillor Tom Curley resigned from the party on 29 October 2016 and announced he would stand as an Independent in 2017.

2007 Election

References

Wards of North Lanarkshire
Airdrie, North Lanarkshire